Dragana (Serbian) was a Serbian princess and the Empress consort of Bulgaria as the second wife of Ivan Shishman (r. 1371–1395). She was a daughter of the Serbian Prince Lazar and Princess Milica Nemanjić.

Early life
Dragana was a daughter of Lazar and Milica Nemanjić, thus belonged to the Lazarević and Nemanjić dynasties. She was likely the second of five daughters, and was named after her paternal aunt Dragana, the wife of magnate Musa.

Dragana married into the Bulgarian dynasty in ca. 1386 at a time when her father tried to consolidate the Balkan rulers and magnates through marriage alliances in order to plan for conflict with the Ottoman Empire.

Consort
There are almost no historical sources about her. There is a text in the Boril Obituary concerning the consorts of Ivan Shishman:

Based on that text, Bulgarian historian Plamen Pavlov suggested a new theory about her; he assumed that since Lazar had no wife named Desislava, it is possible that the first wife of Ivan Shishman was Maria and Dragana was called Kira Maria, unless there is a mistake in the paragraph.

It is possible that she was the mother of Fruzhin and Alexander.

References

Sources
 

Bulgarian consorts
14th-century Bulgarian people
14th-century Serbian royalty
Medieval Serbian princesses
Lazarević dynasty
14th-century Bulgarian women
14th-century Serbian women